Chrysoritis violescens, the violet opal, is a butterfly of the family Lycaenidae found only in South Africa.

The wingspan is 26–30 mm for males and 30–38 mm for females. Its flight period is from August to December.

The larvae feed on Dimorphotheca cuneata. They are attended to by Crematogaster peringueyi ants.

References

Butterflies described in 1971
Chrysoritis
Endemic butterflies of South Africa